

Episodes

Season 31 (2005–06)

Season 32 (2006–07)

Season 33 (2007–08)

Season 34 (2008–09)

Season 35 (2009–10)

Season 36 (2010–11)

Season 37 (2011–12)

Season 38 (2012–13)

Season 39 (2013–14)

Season 40 (2014–15)

Season 41 (2015–16)

Season 42 (2016–17)

Season 43 (2017–18)

Season 44 (2018–19)

Season 45 (2019–20)

Season 46 (2020–21)

Season 47 (2021–22)

Season 48 (2022–23)

Specials

References

Notes 

Saturday Night Live
Saturday Night Live
Episodes
Saturday Night Live in the 2000s
Saturday Night Live in the 2010s
Saturday Night Live in the 2020s